The 6th Infantry Division was an infantry division of the United States Army active in World War I, World War II, and the last years of the Cold War. Known as "Red Star", it was previously called the "Sight Seein' Sixth".

World War I
Activated: November 1917

Subordinate Units:

 Headquarters, 6th Division
 11th Infantry Brigade
 51st Infantry Regiment
 52nd Infantry Regiment
 17th Machine Gun Battalion
 12th Infantry Brigade
 53rd Infantry Regiment
 54th Infantry Regiment
 18th Machine Gun Battalion
 6th Field Artillery Brigade
 3rd Field Artillery Regiment (75 mm)
 11th Field Artillery Regiment (155 mm)
 78th Field Artillery Regiment (75 mm)
 6th Trench Mortar Battery
 16th Machine Gun Battalion
 318th Engineer Regiment
 6th Field Signal Battalion
 Headquarters Troop, 6th Division
 6th Train Headquarters and Military Police
 6th Ammunition Train
 6th Supply Train
 6th Engineer Train
 6th Sanitary Train
 20th, 37th, 38th, and 40th Ambulance Companies and Field Hospitals

The division went overseas in June 1918, and saw 43 days of combat. Casualties totalled 386 (KIA: 38; WIA: 348).

The 6th Division saw combat in the Geradmer sector, Vosges, France, 3 September – 18 October 1918, and during the Meuse-Argonne offensive 1–11 November 1918. Separately the 11th Field Artillery Battalion became engaged earlier in the Meuse-Argonne offensive and fought from 19 October to the Armistice.

Commanders

Interwar period

The division returned to the U.S. in June 1919, and was demobilized, less the 12th Infantry Brigade and certain supporting units, on 30 September 1921 at Camp Grant, Illinois. During the interwar period, elements of the 6th Division were located within the Sixth Corps Area as part of the VI Army Corps. By mid-1927, most of the other elements of the division had been organized with Organized Reserve personnel as Regular Army Inactive units.

World War II

Activated: 12 October 1939 at Fort Lewis, Washington State
Overseas: 21 July 1943
Campaigns: Luzon, New Guinea
Days of combat: 306
Distinguished Unit Citations: 7
Awards: MH: 2, DSC: 10, DSM: 3, SS: 697, LM: 18, DFC: 3, SM: 94, BSM: 3,797, AM: 45.
Subordinate Units:

Order of battle

 Headquarters, 6th Infantry Division
1st Infantry Regiment
20th Infantry Regiment
63rd Infantry Regiment
 Headquarters and Headquarters Battery, 6th Infantry Division Artillery
 1st Field Artillery Battalion
 51st Field Artillery Battalion
 53rd Field Artillery Battalion
 80th Field Artillery Battalion 
 6th Engineer Combat Battalion
 6th Medical Battalion 
 6th Cavalry Reconnaissance Troop (Mechanized)
 Headquarters, Special Troops, 6th Infantry Division
 Headquarters Company, 6th Infantry Division
 706th Ordnance Light Maintenance Company 
 6th Quartermaster Company 
 6th Signal Company 
 Military Police Platoon
 Band
 6th Counterintelligence Corps Detachment
Nickname: "Sightseeing Sixth"
Inactivated: 10 January 1949 in Korea

World War II combat chronicle
The division moved to Hawaii in July and August 1943 to assume defensive positions on Oahu, training meanwhile in jungle warfare. It moved to Milne Bay, New Guinea, 31 January 1944, and trained until early June 1944. The division first saw combat in the Toem-Wakde area of Dutch New Guinea, engaging in active patrolling 14–18 June, after taking up positions 6–14 June. Moving west of Toem, it fought the bloody Battle of Lone Tree Hill, 21–30 June, and secured the Maffin Bay area by 12 July.

After a brief rest, the division made an assault landing at Sansapor, 30 July, on the Vogelkop Peninsula. The 6th secured the coast from Cape Waimak to the Mega River and garrisoned the area until December 1944.

The division landed at Lingayen Gulf, Luzon, in the Philippines on D-day, 9 January 1945, and pursued the Japanese into the Cabanatuan hills, 17–21 January, capturing Muñoz on 7 February. On 27 January, Special Operations units also attached to the Sixth United States Army took part in the Raid at Cabanatuan. The division then drove northeast to Dingalan Bay and Baler Bay, 13 February, isolating enemy forces in southern Luzon. The U.S. 1st Infantry Regiment operated on Bataan together with the Philippine Commonwealth forces, 14–21 February, cutting the peninsula from Abucay to Bagac.

The division then took part in the Battle of Manila, shifting to the Shimbu Line northeast of Manila, 24 February, took Mount Mataba, 17 April, Mount Pacawagan, 29 April, Bolog, 29 June, Lane's Ridge of Mount Santo Domingo, 10 July, and Kiangan, 12 July. The 6th remained with the Philippine Military forces in the Cagayan Valley and the Cordilleras Mountains until VJ-day.

After the war, the division moved to Korea and controlled the southern half of the United States zone of occupation until inactivated.

Casualties

Total battle casualties: 2,370
Killed in action: 410
Wounded in action: 1,957
Missing in action: 3

Medal of Honor recipients
Medal of Honor recipients for the 6th Infantry Division during World War II:

Corporal Melvin Mayfield of Company D, 20th Infantry Regiment, 6th Infantry Division—Cordillera Mountains, Luzon, Philippine Islands, 29 July 1945
Second Lieutenant (then T/Sgt.) Donald E. Rudolph of Company E, 2nd Battalion, 20th Infantry Regiment, 6th Infantry Division—Munoz, Luzon, Philippine Islands, 5 February 1945

Commanders

Post World War

Cold War era
The 6th Division was reactivated 4 October 1950 at Fort Ord, California. There the division remained throughout the Korean War, training troops and providing personnel for combat, but was never deployed overseas as an entity itself and was again inactivated on 3 April 1956.

In the American build-up during the Vietnam War the Division was reactivated in 1967 at Fort Campbell, Kentucky, and later a forward brigade was located in Hawaii. There was sentiment against sending the Division to Vietnam because its shoulder sleeve insignia (a red six-pointed star) invited a derisive nickname ("Commie Jew Division") that General Westmoreland, cognizant of troop morale problems, considered too offensive, and the decision was made instead to form the Americal Division (23rd Infantry Division), with less offensive insignia, in Vietnam itself. During June 1968 the US Joint Chiefs of Staff also declared the Division unsuitable for combatant deployment because it failed its readiness report and shortly thereafter the Division was inactivated on 25 July 1968.

The Division never received its full TO&E equipment and most of its personnel were Vietnam returnees.  The purpose for activating the division was to obtain military hardware which would eventually be turned over to the South Vietnamese.

The last incarnation of the Division came on 16 April 1986 under the command of Major General Johnnie H. Corns at Fort Richardson, Alaska when the assets of the 172nd Infantry Brigade were used to reactivate the 6th Infantry Division (Light). Over the next seven years the 6th was the U.S. Army's primary Arctic warfare division.

Organization 1989 
The planned activation of two additional light infantry battalions for the division, one at Fort Richardson in October 1988, and one at Fort Wainwright in May 1989, was cancelled with the Fiscal Year 1988 budget. To round-out the division the 6th Battalion, 297th Infantry, of the Alaska Army National Guard was activated on 1 September 1989.

At the end of the Cold War parts of the division were organized as follows:

 6th Infantry Division (Light), Fort Richardson, Alaska
 Headquarters & Headquarters Company
 1st Brigade, Fort Richardson
1st Battalion(LT), 17th Infantry Regiment (United States)
2nd Battalion(LT), 17th Infantry Regiment. (October 1989 2-17 Infantry became 1-501 Infantry)
1st Battalion (ABN), 501st Infantry Regiment (United States)
6th Battalion(MECH), 297th Infantry Regiment (United States), an Alaska Army National Guard, unit.
2nd Brigade, Fort Wainwright
 4th Battalion(LT), 9th Infantry Regiment (United States)
 5th Battalion(LT), 9th Infantry Regiment
 205th Infantry Brigade (Light), Fort Snelling, Minnesota (Army Reserve)
 Headquarters and Headquarters Company
 3rd Battalion, 3rd Infantry, Saint Paul, Minnesota
 1st Battalion, 409th Infantry, St. Cloud, Minnesota
 1st Battalion, 410th Infantry, Iowa City, Iowa
 3rd Battalion, 14th Field Artillery, Sioux City, Iowa (18 × M101 105mm towed howitzer)
 Support Battalion
 Cavalry Troop
 Engineer Company
 Aviation Brigade, Fort Wainwright
 Headquarters & Headquarters Company
 4/9th Air Cavalry Squadron 
 2nd Battalion, 123rd Aviation (Attack), Saint Paul, Minnesota (Army Reserve)
 4th Battalion, 123rd Aviation (Combat Support)
 Division Artillery, Fort Richardson, Alaska
 Headquarters & Headquarters Battery
 4th Battalion, 11th Field Artillery, Fort Richardson (18 × M101 105mm towed howitzer)
 5th Battalion, 11th Field Artillery, Fort Wainwright (18 × M101 105mm towed howitzer)
 Battery G, 11th Field Artillery, Mankato, Minnesota (Army Reserve, 8 × M198 155mm towed howitzer)
 6th Division Support Command
 Headquarters & Headquarters Company, Medical Battalion, Supply & Transportation Battalion, Maintenance Battalion
 431st Aviation Intermediate Maintenance Company, Saint Paul, Minnesota (Army Reserve)
 1st Battalion, 188th Air Defense Artillery, Grand Forks, North Dakota (North Dakota Army National Guard)
 6th Engineer Battalion, Fort Wainwright
 6th Signal Battalion, Fort Richardson
 106th Military Intelligence Battalion, Fort Richardson
 6th Military Police Company
 Chemical Company
 6th Division Band

In 1988 the airborne companies (Charlie Airborne) of 1-17 Infantry, 2-17 Infantry and 4-9 Infantry were consolidated in 2-17 Infantry, giving the 6th ID an airborne battalion. Notable operational deployments included an eight-month deployment to the Sinai Peninsula in Egypt by 1st Battalion, 17th Infantry Regiment, in 1990 as part of the Multinational Force and Observers. The deployment began as a six-month rotation but was extended in August 1990 due to the Iraqi invasion of Kuwait which precipitated Operation Desert Shield and delayed the arrival of their relieving unit. The division headquarters was moved from Fort Richardson to Fort Wainwright (near Fairbanks) in 1990. Commanders during the Arctic activation included Maj. Gen. Johnnie H. Corns (1986–1988), Maj. Gen. Samuel E. Ebbesen (1990–1992) and Maj. Gen. David A. Bramlett (1992–1994). The division had two active maneuver brigades and the Army Reserve's 205th Infantry Brigade (Light) was assigned as the division's roundout force. The 1st Battalion, 188th Air Defense Artillery of the North Dakota Army National Guard served as the division's roundout Air Defense Artillery. They were the only National Guard Air Defense battalion to ever roundout an active duty division.

Inactivation
The division was inactivated most recently on 6 July 1994, and reduced to a single brigade, the 1st Brigade, 6th Infantry Division. In reality, the 6th no longer existed as a division and command of the brigade fell under the 10th Mountain Division (Light Infantry) at Fort Drum, NY. In April 1998, 1st Brigade was reflagged back to the separate 172nd Infantry Brigade from which the division had been reestablished in 1986. The 172nd Brigade was then reflagged as the 1st Brigade Combat Team (Stryker), 25th Infantry Division on 16 December 2006.

On 16 October 2008 the division's HHC 6th Engineer Battalion was reactivated as a non-divisional unit in Alaska. In this new role it is configured as an Airborne unit with two subordinate engineer companies: the 23d Engineer Company and the 84th Engineer Company.

References

The Army Almanac: A Book of Facts Concerning the Army of the United States U.S. Government Printing Office, 1950 reproduced at CMH .
The Army in Alaska.
Northern Edge.

External links

 Brief History of the 6th US Infantry Division By Thomas E. Price
 Unit Histories Site
 Reunion page @ Military.com
 

006th Infantry Division, U.S.
Military units and formations established in 1917
Military units and formations disestablished in 1994
Military units and formations in Alaska
Infantry Division, U.S. 006th
06
Infantry divisions of the United States Army in World War II